Stierva is a former municipality in the district of Albula in the canton of Graubünden in Switzerland.  On 1 January 2015 the former municipalities of Alvaschein, Mon, Stierva, Tiefencastel, Alvaneu, Brienz/Brinzauls and Surava merged to form the new municipality of Albula/Alvra.

In the 2000 census, some two-thirds of the population declared Romansh as a first language, with most of the rest speaking German.

History
Stierva is first mentioned in 841 Seturiuo.  Until 1943 Stierva was known as Stürvis.

Geography

Of this area, 49.3% is used for agricultural purposes, while 42.1% is forested. Of the rest of the land, 1.8% is settled (buildings or roads) and the remainder (6.7%) is non-productive (rivers, glaciers or mountains).

The municipality is located in the Alvaschein sub-district of the Albula district.  It is a haufendorf (an irregular, unplanned and quite closely packed village, built around a central square) above the lower Albula valley.

Demographics
Stierva had a population (as of 2013) of 134.  , 1.5% of the population was made up of foreign nationals.  Over the last 10 years the population has decreased at a rate of -5.8%.  Most of the population speaks Rhaeto-Romance (66.4%), with German  being second most common (32.8%) and Italian being third ( 0.8%).

, the gender distribution of the population was 46.6% male and 53.4% female.  The age distribution, in Stierva is; 20 people or 15.6% of the population are between 0 and 9 years old.  6 people or 4.7% are 10 to 14, and  people or 0.0% are 15 to 19.  Of the adult population, 17 people or 13.3% of the population are between 20 and 29 years old.  21 people or 16.4% are 30 to 39, 15 people or 11.7% are 40 to 49, and 12 people or 9.4% are 50 to 59.  The senior population distribution is 13 people or 10.2% of the population are between 60 and 69 years old, 16 people or 12.5% are 70 to 79, there are 7 people or 5.5% who are 80 to 89, and there is 1 person or 0.8% who are 90 to 99.

In the 2007 federal election the most popular party was the CVP which received 45.2% of the vote.  The next three most popular parties were the SVP (40.6%), the SPS (7.8%) and the FDP (5.9%).

In Stierva about 66.7% of the population (between age 25-64) have completed either non-mandatory upper secondary education or additional higher education (either university or a Fachhochschule).

Stierva has an unemployment rate of 0%.  , there were 21 people employed in the primary economic sector and about 11 businesses involved in this sector.  6 people are employed in the secondary sector and there are 2 businesses in this sector.  7 people are employed in the tertiary sector, with 4 businesses in this sector.

The historical population is given in the following table:

References

External links

 Official website 
 

Albula/Alvra
Former municipalities of Graubünden